Kahna  is a village in Kapurthala district of Punjab State, India. The village is administrated by a Sarpanch who is an elected representative of village as per the constitution of India and Panchayati raj (India).

Demography 
According to the report published by Census India in 2011, Kahna has total number of 131 houses and population of 710 of which include 339 males and 371 females. Literacy rate of Kahna is 78.47%, higher than state average of 75.84%.  The population of children under the age of 6 years is 69 which is  9.72% of total population of Kahna, and child sex ratio is approximately 1226, higher than state average of 846.

Population data

References

External links
  Villages in Kapurthala
 Kapurthala Villages List

Villages in Kapurthala district